Rheocles sikorae is a species of rainbowfish in the subfamily Bedotiinae, the Madagascar rainbowfishes. It is endemic to Madagascar where found in tropical rivers and streams.

Distribution and status
Rheocles sikorae is native to Madagascar, where found in the Mangoro stream, high valley of the east coast of the island, and in the Manambola River near Anosibe.

At one point in time, this species was thought to be extinct, but since 1996 it has been collected from five forested stream localities near the town of Marolambo.

Taxonomy and name
Rheocles sikorae was described by Henri Émile Sauvage in 1891 as Eleotris sikorae with a type locality given as "Madagascar". Sauvage honoured the Austrian explorer Franz Sikora (1863-1902), who collected the type.

References

Sources

sikorae
Fish described in 1891
Taxonomy articles created by Polbot